Yamgan() is one of the 29 districts of Badakhshan Province in eastern Afghanistan.  It was created in 2005 from part of the  Baharak District and is home to approximately 20,000 residents, mostly Ismailis.

History
During the Afghan Civil War the area was under Taliban influence from 2015 to 2019, on September of that year Afghan National Security Forces declared they had full control over it. On late March 2020 the district was fully captured by the Taliban.

See also
Baharak district

References

External links
Map at the Afghanistan Information Management Services

Districts of Badakhshan Province